Edenbridge is a town and civil parish in the Sevenoaks district of Kent, England. Its name derives from Old English Eadhelmsbrigge (meaning "Eadhelm's Bridge"). It is located on the border of Kent and Surrey, on the upper floodplain of the River Medway and takes its name from that river's tributary, the River Eden. The town had a population of 7,808 in 2011.

History

The old part of the town grew along a section of the otherwise disused Roman road, the London to Lewes Way at the point where it crossed the river. Iron slag from iron smelting in the surrounding area was used in building the road. In the Middle Ages it became a centre of the Wealden iron industry. There are many mediaeval timber buildings in the town, one of which houses the Eden Valley Museum.

With the coming of the railways the town expanded and the community of Marlpit Hill, north of the original settlement, is now part of the town.

After World War II, the London County Council built two modernist housing estates at Stangrove Park and Spitals Cross.

Owing to its position on the River Eden floodplain, the centre of the town is prone to severe flooding. The worst flood occurred in 1958, before any flood defences were built, and led to enormous damage to the High Street. Ten years later in 1968, despite the Eden having been dredged to prevent the same occurrence, the town was once again flooded after heavy storms in September. Although there were no fatalities, a helicopter was needed to save a man from his flooded home. Local legend has it that he hadn't noticed the flood waters rising, having been too engrossed in The Forsyte Saga on television. More adequate flood defences have been built since then, with the local community now well prepared to deal with possible flooding. In December 2019 the town was "paralysed" when the river again burst its banks.

Mills
Edenbridge has had four mills over the centuries, Haxted Mill and Honour's Mill on the River Eden, Christmas Mill on a tributary of the Eden, and a windmill to the south of the town. All four mill buildings survive, but now converted to other uses.

Railways
There are two railway stations serving Edenbridge. The earliest, on the South Eastern Railway (SER) route from Redhill to Tonbridge, was opened on 26 May 1842. The station, simply named Edenbridge, is located in Marlpit Hill. To the west of that station the route crosses what was once the London, Brighton and South Coast Railway main line from London to Tunbridge Wells and Eastbourne (via Lewes), opened on 2 January 1888. The crossing of the two lines takes place at a mid-break in the Edenbridge Tunnel on the SER line. The second station, named Edenbridge Town is about a mile South-east of this point. The line serving it is now truncated at Uckfield. There is no connection here between the two routes: Edenbridge is not a junction; one existed four miles (6 km) to the west of Edenbridge Town at Crowhurst, but that junction with the Oxted to East Grinstead line no longer exists. Severe damage to the embankments of both the SER line and the East Grinstead line occurred following the excessive rains in the winter of 2019/2020 but was repaired after extensive works by end of March 2020. 

All services at both stations are operated by Southern, which manages both stations.

On Sundays this service terminates at  instead of London Bridge.

Town
Edenbridge is twinned with Mont-Saint-Aignan in France. The inner relief road that was built in the early 2000s to relieve traffic pressure on the old, narrow High Street is named Mont St Aignan Way. There are now no banks in the town, (just a mobile bank at the small Thursday market) a post office next to St Lawrence's RC church and a number of major retail chains.

Despite being a relatively small town, Edenbridge still has its own hospital - The Edenbridge War Memorial Hospital. Initially a cottage hospital built to care for soldiers returning from The First World War, a purpose built building was established to the south of the town in 1931. With an Out Patients Department, Physiotherapy facilities and a Minor Injuries Unit the hospital is a major part of the fabric of the town. In recent years the hospital has been faced with closure many times, on each occasion it has been saved by local campaigners and townspeople, who see the hospital as an essential part of the community. It is now planned to replace it with a new GP centre with day surgery facilities.

The Edenbridge Bonfire Society is to burn an effigy of former prime minister Liz Truss and a lettuce on a bonfire on Guy Fawkes Night 2022. The box will also contain a copy of her mini-budget, a T-shirt with the slogan "I am a fighter, not a quitter", and a £115,00 cheque referring to the continual funding for ex-prime ministers.

Parish and places of worship

The 13th-century Anglican parish church of Church of St Peter and St Paul is a Grade I-listed building . It has a set of windows by Sir Edward Burne-Jones in the east wall. The church contains examples of medieval graffiti including ritual protection marks such as the VV symbol. A Baptist chapel on the High Street was registered for marriages in 1860. It was the home of the Edenbridge Baptist Church, which re-combined with its 'daughter' church at Marlpit Hill in 2003 to form the Eden Church, which moved in 2013 to The Eden Centre. 

Roman Catholics worship at St Lawrence's Church, registered in 1933.

Also in the parish is the hamlet of Marsh Green.  Two places of worship are located here: St John's United Reformed Church and a Kingdom Hall which serves the Oxted Congregation of Jehovah's Witnesses.  It was registered for marriages in 1999.

The Grade II-listed former Ebenezer Chapel, used by Independent Calvinists and later by Strict Baptists, stands on Edenbridge High Street. It is now a community café and meeting place In the Marlpit Hill area of the town, St Paulinus' Church Centre was used for worship and as a village hall, but has an uncertain future. Nearby, Marlpit Hill Baptist Church (built in the late 19th century) re-combined with its former parent (see above) to form the Eden Church and the building has been demolished to be replaced by housing.

People

 Walter Galpin Alcock (1861–1947), organist and composer, who had the unique distinction of playing the organ at the Coronations of Edward VII, George V and George VI, was born in Edenbridge.
 Ralph Alger Bagnold, (1896–1990), desert explorer, lived in Edenbridge in his final years.
 David Henry Bartleet (1929–2001), was vicar of Edenbridge.
 Tony Burns (b 1944), football player and manager, was born in Edenbridge.
 Lennox Cato (b 1962), expert on the Antiques Roadshow lives in the town.
 Tom Chatfield (b 1980), author, lives in the town.
 Rob Cross (b 1990), professional darts player, lives in the town.
 Mike Manley (b 1964), CEO of Fiat Chrysler Automobiles
 Jasper Maskelyne (1902-1973), magician, grew up in Edenbridge.
 John Surtees (1934–2017), world champion motorcycle racer and formula one racing driver, had his workshop in Edenbridge.
 Henry Surtees (1991–2009), racing driver and son of John, lived in Edenbridge.
 William Taillour (1406–83), Lord Mayor of London in 1468 lived in Edenbridge.
 Tom Tugendhat (b 1973), Conservative Member of Parliament for Tonbridge and Malling, lives in Edenbridge. The town is also in his constituency.

See also
List of places of worship in Sevenoaks (district)

References

External links

Marlpit Hill community website

 
Civil parishes in Kent
Towns in Kent